Aliy Zirkle (born 1970 in New Hampshire) is an American champion of sled dog racing.

Aliy Zirkle moved to Bettles, Alaska at age twenty and began mushing due to the remote nature of the town. She adopted six sled dogs and began learning how to race and train dogs. Aliy raced her first Yukon Quest in 1998 and her first Iditarod Trail Sled Dog Race in 2001. In 2000, she became the first woman to win the Yukon Quest, finishing the race with a time of 10 days, 22 hours and 57 minutes. Aliy has been the runner-up in the Iditarod three consecutive years, 2012, 2013, and 2014. Her best time in the Iditarod came in 2014, when she finished the race with a time of 8 days, 13 hours, 6 minutes and 41 seconds. Aliy has finished the Iditarod 14 times and the Yukon Quest 3 times. She has completed either the Yukon Quest or the Iditarod every year since 1998. Aliy also regularly competes in shorter dog sled races, such as the Two Rivers 100, the Copper Basin 300, and the Yukon Quest 300.

Aliy has received various awards throughout her mushing career, some of which were awarded to her by her fellow mushers. These awards include the Yukon Quest Challenge of the North award, given to the musher who "most exemplifies the spirit of the Yukon Quest, a spirit that compels one to challenge the country and win", and the Iditarod Leonhard Seppala Humanitarian Award for exemplary care of her dogs.

Aliy met fellow musher Allen Moore in 1998 and the two were married in 2005. Aliy has two step-daughters, Brigett and Jennifer, through Allen. Together Aliy and Allen run Skunk's Place (SP) Kennel in Two Rivers, Alaska. The kennel is named for Skunk, one of the six dogs Aliy adopted when she first moved to Alaska and began mushing.

During the 2016 Iditarod race Aliy Zirkle, along with fellow competitor Jeff King, was intentionally hit by a man on a snowmobile. He killed one of King's dogs.

She had announced that the 2021 Iditarod would be her 21st and last Iditarod race. Her husband, who had been the oldest musher to ever win the Yukon Quest had retired a year earlier. In 2021, due to COVID-19 and weather conditions, the course was shortened. When she arrived at the Rohn checkpoint, she fell and had to be airlifted to Anchorage for a concussion and upper torso injuries, though suffered no broken bones.

Race standings
Yukon Quest Results

Iditarod Results

2014 Iditarod Record

Awards

See also
 List of Yukon Quest competitors
 List of sled dog races

References

External links
 The Iditarod Trail Sled Dog Race Official site, with webcams and data

 Live GPS Tracking of Race
 Aliy Zirkle's Kennel website
 Musher profile on Iditarod official website

1970 births
Date of birth missing (living people)
Dog mushers from Alaska
Living people
People from Fairbanks North Star Borough, Alaska
Place of birth missing (living people)
Sportspeople from New Hampshire
People from Yukon–Koyukuk Census Area, Alaska